= Sillycook Mountain =

Mountain in Georgia, United States

Coordinates: 34.72901°N 83.55278°W

Sillycook Mountain is a summit in the U.S. state of Georgia. The elevation is 2,172 feet (662 m).

Sillycook is a name derived from the Cherokee language meaning "turtle", which was applied to this mountain on account of its shape.
